Grete Treier (born 12 December 1977) is an Estonian road bicycle racer.

She finished 30th in the road race at the 2008 Olympic Games, and 17th in the road race at the 2012 Olympic Games.

References

1977 births
Living people
Sportspeople from Tartu
Estonian female cyclists
Cyclists at the 2008 Summer Olympics
Olympic cyclists of Estonia
Cyclists at the 2012 Summer Olympics